Tom's Hardware is an online publication owned by Future plc and focused on technology. It was founded in 1996 by Thomas Pabst. It provides articles, news, price comparisons, videos and reviews on computer hardware and high technology. The site features coverage on CPUs, motherboards, RAM, PC cases, graphic cards, display technology, power supplies and displays, storage, smartphones, tablets, gaming, consoles, and computer peripherals.

Tom's Hardware has a forum and featured blogs.

History
Tom's Hardware was founded in April 1996 as Tom's Hardware Guide in the United States by Thomas Pabst. It started using the domain tomshardware.com in September 1997 and was followed by several foreign language versions, including Italian, French, Finnish and Russian based on franchise agreements.

While the initial testing labs were in Germany and California, much of Tom's Hardware's testing now occurs in New York and a facility in Ogden, Utah owned by its parent company. In April 2007, the site was acquired by the French company Bestofmedia Group. In July 2013, that company was acquired by TechMediaNetwork, Inc., which changed its name to Purch in April 2014. Purch's consumer brands, including Tom's Hardware, were acquired by Future in 2018.

The site celebrated its 20th anniversary in May 2016. Beyond continuous publication of the website, it is known for its overclocking championships and other contests.

Editors 
Avram Piltch is the current editor-in-chief of Tom's Hardware. Prior to starting the position in 2018, he worked for sister sites Tom's Guide and Laptop Mag. Prior to that, John A. Burek, formerly of Computer Shopper, briefly held the role.

Burek succeeded Fritz Nelson, who served from August 2014 through 2017. Other former editors-in-chief include Chris Angelini (July 2008 – July 2014), Patrick Schmid (2005–2006), David Strom (2005), Omid Rahmat (1999–2003) and founder Thomas Pabst (1996–2001).

Related publications 
Tom's Hardware is owned by Future plc, which also owns a number of other websites. In technology, those include Tom's Guide (formerly Gear Digest), Laptop Mag and AnandTech, as well as science sites like LiveScience and Space.com.

In March 2018 the German spin-off was to be closed because of the new data/privacy laws, but continued as an independent site (tomshw.de), with an exclusive licence for the local usage of the brand name.

In July 2019 the licence was returned. After that the German CEO and editor-in-chief of the gotIT! Tech Media GmbH started a new website Igor´sLAB and his own Youtube channel.

Tom's Guide 
Tom's Guide (formerly known as GearDigest) is an online publication owned by Future that focuses on technology, with editorial teams in the US, UK and Australia. Tom's Guide was launched in 2007 by Bestofmedia, which was subsequently acquired by TechMediaNetwork in 2013; in 2014, TechMediaNetwork changed its name to Purch, which was acquired by Future in 2018. Primarily focused on news, reviews, price comparisons, how-tos and guides, Tom's Guide also features opinion articles and deals content. 

The site features coverage on CPUs, motherboards, RAM, PC cases, graphic cards, display technology, displays, storage, smartphones, tablets, gaming, consoles, fitness and health, home, smart home, streaming, security and computer peripherals. 

It is the second largest consumer technology, news and review site from the US with 68.4M visits in September 2022.

History 
Tom’s Guide was originally launched as Gear Digest by Bestofmedia before being re-named to Tom's Guide. The publication was subsequently acquired by TechMediaNetwork in 2013; in 2014, TechMediaNetwork changed its name to Purch, which was then acquired by Future in 2018.

While the initial testing labs were in Germany and California, much of Tom’s Hardware’s testing now occurs in New York and a facility in Ogden, Utah owned by its parent company, Purch.

In April 2007, the site was acquired by the French company Bestofmedia Group. In July 2013, that company was acquired by TechMediaNetwork, Inc., which changed its name to Purch in April 2014.

The site celebrated its 15th anniversary in 2022. Beyond continuous publication of the website, it is known for its annual CES awards and Tom's Guide Awards that are held in June and July each year.

Editors 
Mark Spoonauer is the current Global Editor-in-Chief and has been since 2013. Before that, he worked as the Editor-in-Chief of Laptop Mag since 2003. 

Mike Prospero is the current US Editor-in-Chief alongside Managing Editors Philip Michaels, Roland Moore-Colyer, Nick Pino and Senior Deals Editor Louis Ramirez.

See also 
 CNET
 TechCrunch
 List of Internet forums

References

External links
 
 Tom's Guide

Magazines established in 1996
Computing websites
American technology news websites
Computer magazines published in the United States